Mérens-les-Vals (Languedocien: Merens las Vals) is a commune in the Ariège department in southwestern France.

Geography
Mérens-les-Vals, as its name implies, has several valleys. The village is at the confluence of three valleys: Ariège, Nabre and Morgoulliou.
The village has a train station (Mérens-les-Vals station) on the Portet-Saint-Simon–Puigcerdà railway. The night train from Gare d'Austerlitz, Paris to Latour-de-Carol stops here. The journey taking about nine hours.  There are six local trains a day to Toulouse, this journey takes 2 hours and 15 minutes.

Population

Inhabitants are called Mérengois.

See also
Communes of the Ariège department
Mérens horse

References

Communes of Ariège (department)
Ariège communes articles needing translation from French Wikipedia